Brownsville is an unincorporated community in West Windsor, Vermont, United States. Located on Vermont Route 44, the village houses a number of administrative offices for the town of West Windsor.

Geography

History
The village derives its name from two settlers, John and Briant Brown. The West Windsor Historical Society is in Brownsville and has a wealth of information on the sheep farms and industries that sustained the early residents.

Just east of Brownsville is the entrance to Ascutney Mountain Resort, which used to be one of the major ski areas in the state, until it closed for good in 2010 and their ski lifts were sold in August 2014. In 2015, Brownsville bought the failed ski area, working with the state of Vermont and the nonprofit Trust for Public Land,

Geography

Home of the Brownsville Society

Covered Bridges
Three of Vermont's covered bridges are nearby – Best's Bridge near Churchill Road and Bowers Bridge, both of which are listed in the National Register of Historic Places. The Twigg bridge on Yale Road was moved to its location by a developer and was heavily damaged by wind in 2002.

Government

Notes

 
Unincorporated communities in Vermont
 Brownsville
Unincorporated communities in Windsor County, Vermont